Albizia edwallii is a species of plant in the family Fabaceae. It is found in Argentina and Brazil.

References

edwallii
Trees of Argentina
Trees of Brazil
Vulnerable flora of South America
Taxonomy articles created by Polbot